Arcadia Spectacular, known colloquially as "Arcadia", are a performance art collective that combine elements of sculpture, architecture, recycling, pyrotechnics, lighting, circus and music into large scale performance and dance spaces.  Best known for their 50-tonne "Spider", they rework ex military machinery and industrial components into installations and 360 degree arenas, following a transformational and environmental ethos.

History
Arcadia was founded by Pip Rush (who previously worked alongside his brother, artist Joe Rush, at the Mutoid Waste Company) and Bert Cole, formerly master of the world's largest tent, the Valhalla.

Their first collaboration, the Afterburner, debuted at the Glastonbury Festival in 2007 after being built in a cowshed. Subsequent years saw the Afterburner's refinement until 2010 when three Customs and Excise scanning units were attached as "legs". This first incarnation of the "Spider" led to two more years of adjustments until they became separate installations in permanent form. Arcadia's installations are built from recycled materials and military equipment.

Arcadia have developed a series of mechanical landscapes and performance-based shows between 2007 and the present, collaborated with New Zealander Carlos van Camp to form the Lords of Lightning and built the mobile Bug Stage which appeared at the closing ceremony of the 2012 Paralympics.

In 2014, Arcadia were given a permanent area at the Glastonbury Festival and Arcadia perform with the Spider in Bangkok, Thailand. The Afterburner traveled to New Zealand for New Year's Eve at the Rhythm & Vines festival before travelling to Miami's Ultra Music Festival in March 2015 as part of its new "Resistance" area.

In September 2015, Arcadia performed to 24,000 people over two nights in Bristol's Queen Square. This event that also celebrated Bristol's year as European Green Capital featured the world's first pyrotechnic flame system run entirely on recycled biofuel. In March 2016, Arcadia returned to Ultra's Resistance area with the Spider, and autumn 2016 saw city shows in Seoul, Taipei and Perth where they collaborated with the Noongar people of Western Australia.

In 2018, they registered an Instagram account, and successfully obtained the deletion of another user account of the same name which had been registered since 2010.

In 2019, Arcadia launched Pangea at the Glastonbury Festival, a new area centered around a re-purposed 140 ton dock crane previously installed at Avonmouth port in Bristol. The crane's ultimate purpose is the development of a new hemispherical stage concept to 'take over the sky' above audiences.

Areas and performances
Pangea Pangea is a 360 degree hemispherical stage that will evolve over five years at the Glastonbury Festival with a re-purposed 140 tonne dock crane at its heart

The Spider   The Spider is a 360 degree  structure built from recycled materials. Its 'legs' are Customs and Excise scanning units, its 'eyes' are spy plane engines, its 'claws' are log grabbers, its 'body' is built from helicopter tails and its DJ booth from jet engine blades. The DJ booth is suspended above the dancefloor. The Spider has several built in flame cannons, able to shoot 50 foot flames and is rigged across its 'body' with lights and lasers. Its 'arms' fire jets of CO2, it is often given a 'skin' by video mapping and it is surrounded by a 360 degree 'soundfield' of PA speakers, often in a circle designated by flaming Victorian lampposts.

Metamorphosis Show    The Metamorphosis Show is anchored in themes of transformation and incorporated both into the architecture of the Spider and across the arena with podiums in the midst of the crowd and a ring of external towers. The show features aerial performances, 7 meter mini spiders on zip wires above the crowd, lighting played as a musical instrument, new LED mapping technology, pyrotechnics, hydraulics, robotics, engineering and video mapping to tell a story of metamorphosis.

The Afterburner   The Afterburner is a 360 degree structure built from recycled materials. Its central focus is a flaming spire with multi level, radial platforms extending to a 360 degree inward facing sound system.

The Bug  The Bug is a 6 wheeled, amphibious stage built from submarine moulds and an Alvis Stalwart.

Lords of Lightning   A collaboration with New Zealander Carlos van Camp, a specialist in Tesla electricity. The Lords of Lightning features two performance artists atop podiums containing Tesla coils that generate 4 million volts of electricity. The new Metamorphosis show has seen an evolution of the technology synchronise lightning bolts to musical notes.

Flaming Lampposts  A series of Victorian style lampposts entwined with recycled vehicle exhausts that give a treelike appearance. The lampposts are rigged with flame canons that emit jets of fire which are often synchronized with musical beats.

References

External links
 Arcadia Spectacular website

Performance artist collectives